William de Welles, Lord of Welles, was an English noble.

Life
The son of William de Welles of Alford. Welles paid a fine in 1279 for postponing his knighthood for three years. In 1283 he obtained a licence for a market every Tuesday, at his manor of Alford, Lincolnshire as well as a fair yearly on the eve, day, and morrow of the festival of the Holy Trinity. He nominated attorneys in May 1286, before he went beyond the seas with Hugh le Despenser, Earl of Winchester to Gascony.

Marriage and issue
He married Isabel, daughter of William de Vesci and Agnes de Ferrers, they are known to have had the following issue:
Adam de Welles (died 1311), married Joan Engaine, had issue.
Phillip de Welles
William de Welles of Cottness
Walter de Welles, Canon and Abbot and Nuncio
John de Welles, Treasurer
Galfrid de Welles
Richard de Welles
Cecilia de Welles, nun of Greenfield Priory
Margaret de Welles, prioress of Greenfield Priory
Aline de Welles

Citations

References
 

13th-century English people
Year of birth unknown
Year of death unknown